C'est pour toi (meaning It's For You) is the seventh French-language studio album by Canadian singer Celine Dion, released in Quebec, Canada on 27 August 1985. It topped the chart in Quebec for 12 weeks. The title track, released as the lead single, reached number three in Quebec.

Content
The album includes ten songs co-written and co-produced by Eddy Marnay. One of the tracks, "Virginie... Roman d'amour" had previously been released in France on the album Les oiseaux du bonheur, under the title "Paul et Virginie". A song called "Elle", appeared on Dion's 1994 live album À l'Olympia. This live version of "Elle" was also included on the long box edition of her French greatest hits compilation, On ne change pas (2005).

Commercial performance
The album reached number one in Quebec and stayed at the top for twelve weeks. The title track, released as the first single, reached number three on the Quebec chart. "C'est pour vivre" was issued as the second single (it was released in France as well).

Track listing

Charts

Release history

References

External links

1985 albums
Albums produced by Eddy Marnay
Celine Dion albums